Live in San Francisco may refer to:

Live in San Francisco (Ry Cooder and Corridos Famosos album)
Live in San Francisco (Marilyn Crispell album)
Live in San Francisco (John McLaughlin and Jimmy Herring album)
Live in San Francisco (ProjeKct Four album)
Live in San Francisco (Joe Satriani album)
Live in San Francisco (Thee Oh Sees album)
Live in San Francisco at the Palace of Fine Arts, an EP by Loreena McKennitt
Live at San Francisco (Kate Miller-Heidke DVD)